The deepwater wrasse, Cirrhilabrus bathyphilus, is a species of wrasse native to the Pacific Ocean. It can be found in the aquarium trade.

References

Deepwater wrasse
Taxa named by John Ernest Randall
Fish described in 2002